BGTW may refer to:
British Gibraltar Territorial Waters
British Guild of Travel Writers